Mark Constantine OBE (born 1952) is a British entrepreneur and trichologist best known as the co-founder and CEO of Lush, described as "one of the world's biggest cosmetics firms".

Personal life 
Constantine was born in 1952 in Sutton. 
He failed his GCEs at Weymouth Grammar School and became homeless at the age of 16, sleeping in a tent in an area of woodland.  Later on, he took an apprenticeship as a hairdresser, earning £3 per week.

In 2018 Constantine's childhood friend Jeff Osment wrote Dear John: The Road to Pelindaba about Constantine's quest to trace his absent father John. It was published by Lush to ensure that Amazon could not distribute it, as there had been conflict between Lush and Amazon.

Constantine has a daughter and two sons.

Career

Early beginnings and freelance work

Constantine worked in a cosmetics retailer in the 1970s after being made homeless where he was the victim of workplace sexual harassment. After several jobs in the London area, Constantine relocated back to Poole to work in the freelance cosmetics industry. During his freelance career, Constantine sent samples of his work, such as shampoo, to Dame Anita Roddick, founder of The Body Shop from whom he took some orders. However, due to intellectual property rights which Roddick believe she owned, Constantine sold the company to her in 1991 for a sum of £17 million.

Cosmetics To Go

After the sale, Constantine, along with his wife Margaret ("Mo"), reinvested the capital into Cosmetics To Go, a "direct mail startup." However, this venture ended quickly. Bankruptcy was filed in 1994, citing the products being priced too cheaply and Constantine underestimating business expenses.

Lush

Constantine and Mo founded Lush in Poole in 1995. By 2007 there were 462 Lush stores in 46 countries,  with a combined revenue of $292 million. The company was described in 2018 as "one of the world's biggest cosmetics firms".

Constantine and Mo were both appointed Officer of the Order of the British Empire (OBE) in the 2011 New Year Honours, having been recognised for their "services to the beauty industry."

References

External links
 Audio interview, 40 mins

Living people
1952 births
British retail company founders
People from the London Borough of Sutton
Officers of the Order of the British Empire
English chief executives
English company founders